The 1978 Keith Prowse International, also known as the Chichester International,  was a women's tennis tournament played on outdoor grass courts at Oaklands Park in Chichester in England. The event was part of the A category of the 1978 Colgate Series. It was the eighth edition of the tournament and was held from 12 June through 16 June 1978. First-seeded Evonne Goolagong Cawley won the singles title and earned $6,000 first-prize money.

Finals

Singles
 Evonne Goolagong Cawley defeated  Pam Teeguarden 6–4, 6–4
It was Goolagong Cawley's 6th singles title of the year and the 79th of her career.

Doubles
 Pam Shriver /  Janet Newberry defeated  Michelle Tyler /  Yvonne Vermaak 3–6, 6–3, 6–4

Prize money

Notes

References

External links
 International Tennis Federation (ITF) tournament details

Keith Prowse International
Keith Prowse International
Keith Prowse International
Chichester Tennis Tournament